Louisiana State University Eunice (LSU Eunice or LSUE) is a public junior college in Eunice, Louisiana.  It is the only junior college associated with the Louisiana State University System.  It enrolls over 4,000 full and part-time students and has the highest transfer rates among all two-year institutions in Louisiana.

History
LSU Eunice was founded in 1964 by the Louisiana State Legislature to provide basic higher education opportunities to students located in southwest Louisiana. The LSU Board of Supervisors approved the establishment of LSU Eunice and Louisiana State University Shreveport in 1965.

State Representative Allen C. Gremillion of Crowley was instrumental in passage of the legislation creating LSU Eunice.

Through the work of Curtis Joubert, the former mayor of Eunice, LSU-E established the Cajun Prairie Wildflower Habitat.

Athletics
LSU–Eunice (LSUE) teams are athletically known as the Bengals. The university is a member of the National Junior College Athletic Association (NJCAA). Baseball and softball are Division II NJCAA independent teams, men's and women's basketball competes in Division I in the Miss-Lou Conference, and the men's and women's soccer teams are Division I NJCAA independents.

Men's sports include baseball, basketball and soccer; while women's sports include basketball, soccer and softball. Their official colors are purple and gold.

The LSU–Eunice baseball team plays at Bengal Stadium, the men's and women's basketball teams play at the HPRE Center and the softball team plays at Lady Bengal Softball Field.  The men's and women's soccer teams are currently in the process of constructing a game field.

National Championships 
LSU–Eunice has won six NJCAA national titles in softball and seven NJCAA titles in baseball. Women's basketball has made two appearances at the NJCAA National Tournament and finished as high as fourth in 2007.
 Baseball (7): 2006, 2008, 2010, 2012, 2015, 2018, 2021
 Softball (6): 2011, 2013, 2014, 2016, 2017, 2019

MISS-LOU/LCCAC Conference Championships 
 Women's basketball (4): 2014, 2018, 2019, 2020
 Men's Basketball (1): 2020

Region 23 Championships 
 Baseball (11): 2003, 2004, 2006, 2008, 2009, 2010, 2012, 2013, 2015, 2018
Softball: (6): 2009, 2011, 2012, 2013, 2014, 2019
Men's Soccer (2): 2018, 2019

Notable alumni
Mickey Guillory, Louisiana state representative for Acadia, Evangeline, and St. Landry parishes, 2004-2015

References

External links
Official website
Official athletics website

 
Universities and colleges accredited by the Southern Association of Colleges and Schools
Eunice
Educational institutions established in 1964
Education in Acadia Parish, Louisiana
Buildings and structures in Acadia Parish, Louisiana
1964 establishments in Louisiana
NJCAA athletics
Public universities and colleges in Louisiana